Year 1368 (MCCCLXVIII) was a leap year starting on Saturday (link will display the full calendar) of the Julian calendar.

Events 
 January–December 
 January 23 – The Hongwu Emperor (Zhu Yuanzhang) establishes the Ming Dynasty in China, after the disintegration of the Mongol Yuan Dynasty. He immediately orders every county magistrate to set up four granaries, and halts government taxation on books.
 March 29 – Emperor Chōkei accedes to the throne of Japan.

 Date unknown 
 The Revolt of Saint Titus against rule of the Republic of Venice in the Kingdom of Candia (island of Crete) ends in failure.
 Durrës, the second-largest city in modern-day Albania (at this time known as Dyrrhachium), is captured from the Angevins by Karl Thopia, a powerful feudal prince and warlord.
 Lațcu, son of Bogdan I, deposes his nephew Petru I, and becomes voivode of Moldavia.
 Timur ascends the throne of Samarkand (in modern-day Uzbekistan).
 Maha Thammaracha II becomes ruler of the Sukhothai Kingdom (in modern-day northern Thailand) after the death of Maha Thammaracha I.
 Work begins on the surviving Great Wall of China.
 Mikhail Aleksandrovich becomes the sole ruler of Tver (in modern-day western Russia), after the death of co-ruler and rival Vasiliy Mikhailovich of Kashin.
 Moscow attacks Tver, which counter-attacks with the aid of Lithuania and the Blue Horde.
 The King of Norway sends the last Royal Ship from Norway, to the Greenland Eastern Settlement. This event is part of both the Norse colonization of the Americas, and of the History of Greenland.
 A peace treaty is signed between Norway and the Hanseatic League.
 The Bibliothèque nationale de France (National Library of France) is founded as the Royal Library at the Louvre Palace in Paris, by Charles V of France.
 Petrarch concludes writing the sequence of Italian sonnets and other poems known as Il Canzoniere.

Births 
 February 14 – Sigismund, Holy Roman Emperor (d. 1437)
 December 3 – King Charles VI of France (d. 1422)
 probable 
 Louis VII, Duke of Bavaria (d. 1447)
 Ida de Grey, Cambro-Norman noble  (d. 1426)
 Pope Martin V (d. 1431)
 Thomas Hoccleve, English poet (d. 1426)

Deaths 
 March 29 – Emperor Go-Murakami of Japan (b. 1328)
 August 25 – Andrea Orcagna, Italian painter, sculptor and architect
 September 12 – Blanche of Lancaster, English duchess, spouse of John of Gaunt (b. 1345)
 October 7 – Lionel of Antwerp, 1st Duke of Clarence, son of Edward III of England (b. 1338)
 undated – Maha Thammaracha I, Thai ruler of the Sukhothai Kingdom and Buddhist philosopher (b. c.1300)
 probable – Ibn Battuta, Arabian traveler

References